Franz Keller (1913 - 1991) was a Swiss psychologist, Christian pacifist and left-wing news editor (Zeitdienst).

Keller got his Ph.D in 1938 at University of Bern with the work Eitelkeit und Wahn: Eitelkeit als Charakterschwäche und als Grössen- und Verfolgungswahn; he was a member of the Social Democratic Party of Switzerland and of the Gesellschaft Schweiz-Russland, and published together with Theo Pinkus the “independent-socialist” magazine Zeitdienst.

References

External links
 Literary estate of Franz Keller at the Swiss Social Archive (Schweizerisches Sozialarchiv)
 Franz Keller. Lieber „Trotzdem–Freund“ Sutermeister! Letter to the editor. Swiss Social Archive (Schweizerisches Sozialarchiv), Ar. 128.3, Dossier “Leserbriefe, an die Redaktionen geschickte Texte”.

1913 births
1991 deaths
Swiss Christian pacifists
Swiss newspaper editors
Marxist journalists
Social Democratic Party of Switzerland politicians
University of Bern alumni
20th-century Swiss people